Osulf of Northumbria can refer to:

 Oswulf of Northumbria (d. 759), king of Northumbria
 Osulf I of Bamburgh (fl. 946–54)
 Osulf II of Bamburgh (d. 1067), earl of Bamburgh